Jnana Prabodhini Prashala, is a high school located in Sadashiv Peth, Pune, India. It was started by educationist Dr. V. V. Pendse, in 1962.

The principal of the school is Dr. Milind Naik. The educational system is based development of the various mental and intellectual aspects of brain. The school entertains mainly the 'gifted' students. The students are selected through a two level entrance examination in which the Basic Mental Ability of a candidate is tested.

1. Philosophy
2. History
3. Infrastructure
4. Educational Philosophy
5. Educational Activities

A hostel is available for male students attending school from outside of Pune.

Admissions

The school selects students to Class 5 on the basis of a two-step entrance test. Prospective students are required to take  tests on reasoning ability and mathematics. Selected students are required to take  additional tests and attend an interview. 40 boys and 40 girls are short-listed for admission. The Supreme Court of India rejected the ban on entrance examinations and has allowed the school to proceed the admissions process to continue in February 2014.

Academics and Co-Curricular Activities

The courses include mathematics, science, social science, English, Sanskrit, Marathi and Hindi. However, apart from academic courses, the school gives special attention to self-expression arts such as drama, sculpture, painting, elocution and speech, music, which includes vocal as well as instrumental (tabla and harmonium) and dance.

The school follows a scheme of continuous evaluation, which includes weekly tests, term end examinations, quarterly examinations, assignments and projects. It was one of the pioneers to introduce project-based learning in India. Student from Class 5 to Class 10, have to do an annual project each year. In class 5, the students have to complete a collection based project. In Class 6, they have to do projects which require model building and practical experiments. In Class 7, students have to complete a list of tasks within the stipulated time period. These tasks include writing book reviews, presenting before a large unknown group, learning and demonstrating new arts such as "Bandhni", weaving, making sculptures, memorizing long texts in four different languages etc. These tasks have been prepared under the banner of "Gunavikas Yojana" or development of life skills. This development helps the student to pursue the greater academic and extra-academic demands in his/her higher classes. In class 8, students are expected to do an open ended project in linguistics. In class 9, they have to conduct a research study in the field of science. In class 10, students have to do futurological studies of various social systems are institutes. The school is perhaps the only one in India to encourage futurology projects in class 10.
Along with this, students at Jnana Prabodhini are known for their involvement in every aspects other than curricular studies. The highly disciplined and organised Dhol-Barchi pathak is a main attraction in the Ganeshotsav. 
Jnana Prabodhini began e-learning in July 2011.

Notable alumni
 General M.M. Naravane 27th Chief of Army Staff (COAS)
 Lt. Gen S.S. Hasabnis - DeputyChief of Army Staff (P&S)
 Avinash Dharmadhikari - Ex-IAS, Founder of Chanakya Mandal Pariwar

See also
List of schools in Pune

References

External links

Schools in Pune
1962 establishments in Maharashtra
Educational institutions established in 1962